Susin Nielsen is a  Canadian author for children, adolescent and young adults. She received a Governor General's Award and the 2013 Canadian Library Association Book of the Year for Children Award for her young adult novel The Reluctant Journal of Henry K. Larsen, which deals with the aftermath of a school shooting.

Career
Susin Nielsen  began her writing career with the Degrassi franchise, writing scripts for the television shows as well as books for the series. Nielsen also played Louella Hawkins the Janitor in Degrassi Junior High. Following her work with Degrassi, Nielsen wrote for many other Canadian television series such as Heartland, What About Mimi?, and Braceface. While working on these shows she produced three children's picture books: Hank and Fergus, Mormor Moves In, and The Magic Beads.

Her first independent novel, Word Nerd, deals with bullying, a theme she returns to in The Reluctant Journal of Henry K. Larsen. Her books often describe the effect of broken families on children.

Nielsen's 2015 book, We Are All Made of Molecules, about two step siblings trying to form a bond with each other, was shortlisted for the Governor General's Award.

Nielsen's books have been translated into Dutch, French, Portuguese, Italian, German and Polish (In the Polish language, not all of them have been translated).

Nielsen's 2021 book, Tremendous Things, was nominated for the 2022 Ontario Library Association's Red Maple Award for Fiction

Awards
For Word Nerd
2010 Ontario Library Association's Red Maple Award for Fiction
For The Reluctant Journal of Henry K. Larsen
Canadian Council for the Arts Governor General's Literature Awards
Canadian Library Association Book of the Year for Children Award 2013 
Ruth and Sylvia Schwartz Award 2013 
2014 Ontario Library Association's Red Maple Award for Fiction

Bibliography
Mormor Moves In (2004)
Hank and Fergus (2005)
The Magic Beads (2007)
Word Nerd (2007)
Dear George Clooney: Please Marry My Mom (2010) – also published as My Messed-Up Life
The Reluctant Journal of Henry K. Larsen (2012)
We Are All Made of Molecules (2015)
Optimists Die First (2017)
No Fixed Address (2018)
Tremendous Things (2021)

References

External links
"Susan Nielsen: The Queen of Tragicomedy" by Cheri Hansen, Quill & Quire, March 2015

Living people
Canadian women novelists
Canadian television writers
Governor General's Award-winning children's writers
21st-century Canadian novelists
21st-century Canadian women writers
Canadian women television writers
Year of birth missing (living people)
Canadian television producers
21st-century Canadian screenwriters
Canadian women television producers